Aressy is a commune in the Pyrénées-Atlantiques department in the Nouvelle-Aquitaine region of south-western France. It is part of the urban area (unité urbaine) of Pau.

The inhabitants of the commune are known as Arésyiens or Arésyiennes

Geography
Aressy is located four kilometres south-east of Pau within the urban area of Pau. Access to the commune is by the D937 road from Pau which continues south-east to Meillon.

The Idelis bus route P23 stops at Aressy Clinic at Pôle Bosquet. The commune is also served by Route 835 of the Interurban network of Pyrénées-Atlantiques (Transports 64) between Bénéjacq and Pau, and by Route 805 between Lourdes and Pau.

Much of the commune is residential with some farmland and a large lake in the south.

The Gave de Pau flows north-west through the western part of the commune, and the Lagoin flows through the centre of the commune before joining the Gave de Pau just north-west of the commune.

Places and Hamlets
 Las Costes
 Labielle
 Marque
 Matachot
 Le Saligat

Neighbouring communes and villages

Toponymy
Its name in Bearnais is Aressi (according to the classical norm of Occitan).

Brigitte Jobbé-Duval indicates that the place name could come from the Basque, meaning "place where there are rocks" which would confirm the hypothesis by Michel Grosclaude of ar- ("stone or rock") with the Basque locative suffix -etz transformed into -esse.

The following table details the origins of the commune name and other names in the commune.

Sources:

Jobbé: Brigitte Jobbé-Duval, Dictionary of place names - Pyrénées-Atlantiques
Raymond: Topographic Dictionary of the Department of Basses-Pyrenees, 1863, on the page numbers indicated in the table. 
Grosclaude: Toponymic Dictionary of communes, Béarn, 2006 
Cassini: Cassini Map from 1750
Ldh/EHESS/Cassini: 

Origins:

Lescar: Cartulary of Lescar
Military: Military Inspection of Béarn
Census: Census of Béarn
Reformation: Reformation of Béarn

History
Paul Raymond noted on page 9 of his dictionary that the commune had a Lay Abbey, vassal of the Viscounts of Béarn. In 1385, Aressy had nine fires and depended on the bailiwick of Pau.

Administration

List of Successive Mayors

Inter-communality
Aressy is part of nine inter-communal structures:
the Public agency of local management;
the Communauté d'agglomération Pau Béarn Pyrénées;
the AEP association for the Jurançon region;
the defense against floods association for the Lagoin catchment area;
the energy association of Pyrénées-Atlantiques;
the inter-communal association for the Narcastet leisure centre;
the inter-communal association for defense against flooding of the Gave de Pau;
the inter-communal association for the construction and operation of the CES of Bizanos;
the Joint association for urban transport Pau - Porte des Pyrenees

Demography
In 2017 the commune had 712 inhabitants.

Economy
The commune is part of the Appellation d'origine contrôlée (AOC) zone designation of Ossau-iraty.

Culture and Heritage

Religious heritage
The Parish Church of Saint Denys (1874) is registered as an historical monument.

See also
Communes of the Pyrénées-Atlantiques department

References

External links
Areßy on the 1750 Cassini Map

Communes of Pyrénées-Atlantiques